England competed at the 1930 British Empire Games in Hamilton, Ontario, Canada, from 16 August to 23 August 1930.

The athletes that competed are listed below.

Athletes

Athletics

Boxing

Diving

Lawn bowls

Rowing

Swimming

Wrestling

References

1930
Nations at the 1930 British Empire Games
British Empire Games